The Nastro d'Argento (Silver Ribbon) is a film award assigned each year, since 1946, by Sindacato Nazionale dei Giornalisti Cinematografici Italiani ("Italian National Syndicate of Film Journalists"), the association of Italian film critics.

Thi is the list of the Nastro d'Argento Awards for the Best New Director, assigned since 1974. Four of the winners of this award have subsequently also received the Nastro d'Argento Award for the Best Director: Maurizio Nichetti, Giuseppe Tornatore, Paolo Virzì and Paolo Sorrentino.

1970s 
1974 - Marco Leto - La villeggiatura
1975 - Luigi Di Gianni - Il tempo dell'inizio
1976 - Ennio Lorenzini - Quanto è bello lu murire acciso
1977 - Giorgio Ferrara - Un cuore simplice
1978 - Sergio Nuti - Non contate su di noi
1979 - Salvatore Nocita - Ligabue

1980s 
1980 - Maurizio Nichetti - Ratataplan
1981 - Massimo Troisi - Ricomincio da tre 
1982 - Alessandro Benvenuti - Ad ovest di Paperino
1983 - Franco Piavoli - Il pianeta azzurro
1984 - Gabriele Lavia - Il principe di Homburg
1985 - Luciano De Crescenzo - Così parló Bellavista
1986 - Enrico Montesano - A me mi piace
1987 - Giuseppe Tornatore - Il camorrista
1988 - Carlo Mazzacurati - Notte italiana
1989 - Francesca Archibugi - Mignon è partita

1990s 
1990 - Ricky Tognazzi - Piccoli equivoci
1991 - Sergio Rubini - La stazione
1992 - Antonio Capuano - Vito e gli altri
1993 - Mario Martone - Morte di un matematico napoletano
1994 - Pappi Corsicato - Libera
1995 - Paolo Virzì - La bella vita
1996 - Sandro Baldoni - Strane storie
1997 - Roberto Cimpanelli - Un inverno freddo freddo
1998 - Roberta Torre - Tano da morire
1999 - Luciano Ligabue -  Radiofreccia

2000s 
2000 - Alessandro Piva - Lacapagira
2001 - Alex Infascelli - Almost Blue
2002 - Paolo Sorrentino - L'uomo in più
2003 - Maria Sole Tognazzi - Past Perfect
2004 - Franco Battiato - Perdutoamor
2005 - Saverio Costanzo - Private
2006 - Francesco Munzi - Saimir
2007 - Kim Rossi Stuart - Anche libero va bene
2008 - Andrea Molaioli - La ragazza del lago
2009 - Gianni Di Gregorio - Pranzo di ferragosto

2010s 
2010
Valerio Mieli - Dieci inverni
Rocco Papaleo - Basilicata coast to coast
2011 - Alice Rohrwacher - Corpo Celeste
2012 - Francesco Bruni - Scialla! (Stai sereno)
2013 - Valeria Golino - Miele
2014 - Pierfrancesco Diliberto - The Mafia Kills Only in the Summer
2015 - Edoardo Falcone - Se Dio vuole
2016 - Gabriele Mainetti - They Call Me Jeeg
2017 - Andrea De Sica - Children of the Night
2018 - Damiano and Fabio D'Innocenzo - Boys Cry
2019 
Leonardo D'Agostini - Il campione
Valerio Mastandrea - Ride

2020s 
2020 - Marco D'Amore - L'immortale

See also 
 David di Donatello for Best New Director
 Cinema of Italy

References

External links 
 Italian National Syndicate of Film Journalists official site  

Nastro d'Argento
Directorial debut film awards